The Beast is an upcoming French-Canadian science fiction romantic drama film directed by Bertrand Bonello from a screenplay by Bonello, Guillaume Bréaud and Benjamin Charbit, freely inspired by Henry James' 1903 novella The Beast in the Jungle. It stars Léa Seydoux and George MacKay. The film is expected to be released in 2023.

Plot
In the near future where emotions have become a threat, Gabrielle finally decides to purify her DNA in a machine that will plunge her into her past lives and rid her of all strong feelings. She then meets Louis and feels a powerful connection, as if she had always known him. The story unfolds over three distinct periods: 1910, 2014 and 2044.

Cast
 Léa Seydoux as Gabrielle
 George MacKay as Louis

Production

Development
On 20 January 2021, French magazine Les Inrockuptibles reported that on 14 January 2021, Arte France Cinéma had allocated support for Bertrand Bonello's next film, La Bête, a sci-fi melodrama starring Gaspard Ulliel and Léa Seydoux. The film is a co-production between France's Les Films du Bélier, Arte France Cinéma, My New Picture, and Canada's Sons of Manual. Ad Vitam will release the film in France, and international sales will be handled by Kinology.

Bonello started writing the screenplay in 2017 with Gaspard Ulliel and Léa Seydoux in mind for the lead roles, after working with them in the 2014 film Saint Laurent. The screenplay, freely inspired by Henry James' 1903 novella The Beast in the Jungle, was written by Bonello with contributions from Guillaume Bréaud and Benjamin Charbit.

Filming was postponed due to the COVID-19 pandemic and was scheduled to start in April 2022. In the meantime, Bonello directed the film Coma (2022) instead, which featured Ulliel in the last movie he filmed and the last work he finished. Ulliel died on 19 January 2022 following a skiing accident, and the filming for The Beast was delayed again. On 13 February 2022, Bonello told Variety that he would likely recast Ulliel's role with a non-French actor.

On 16 May 2022, Variety reported that British actor George MacKay was cast as the male lead. It was also reported that the film will take place in Paris and California, will be shot in French and English, and that filming was scheduled to start in August 2022.

On 4 September 2022, Léa Seydoux told Deadline that George MacKay learned French for the film and that filming will resume in late October.

Filming
Filming started in Paris on 22 August 2022.

References

External links 
 
 The Beast at UniFrance

Upcoming films
2023 films
2023 drama films
French romantic drama films
French science fiction films
Canadian romantic drama films
Canadian science fiction films
2020s French-language films
English-language French films
Films set in Paris
Films shot in Paris
Films shot in California
Films directed by Bertrand Bonello
Films with screenplays by Bertrand Bonello
Arte France Cinéma films
Films based on works by Henry James
Films based on British novels
Films set in 1910
Films set in 2014
Films set in 2044
Film productions suspended due to the COVID-19 pandemic
Films impacted by the COVID-19 pandemic
2020s Canadian films
2020s French films